Lev Ivanovich Favorsky (1893–1969) was a Russian football player, playing as goalkeeper. Favorsky made his debut for the Russian Empire on 30 June 1912 in a 1912 Olympics game against Finland. He let in 16 goals in the next Olympic game against Germany which Russia lost 0:16.

References

External links
  Profile

1893 births
1969 deaths
Russian footballers
Russia international footballers
Footballers at the 1912 Summer Olympics
Olympic footballers of Russia
Association football goalkeepers